This page details the qualifying process for the 1980 Africa Cup of Nations in Nigeria. Nigeria, as hosts, and Ghana, as title holders, qualified automatically.

Qualifying tournament
 qualified as holders
 qualified as hosts

Preliminary round

|}

Malawi won 6–3 on aggregate.

Mauritius won by away goals rule after 2–2 on aggregate.

Benin advanced after Niger withdrew.

First round

|}

Morocco won 6–3 on aggregate.

Libya won 3–2 on aggregate.

Guinea won 6–5 on penalty shootout after 3–3 on aggregate.

Zambia won 4–0 on aggregate.

Ivory Coast won 4–2 on aggregate.

Togo won 2–1 on aggregate.

Zaire won 6–5 on aggregate.

Tanzania won 6–3 on aggregate.

Algeria advanced after Burundi withdrew.

Egypt advanced after Somalia withdrew.

Kenya advanced: Tunisia were disqualified after they were banned from CAF competitions for two years for walking off the pitch to protest the officating during the third-place match of the 1978 African Cup of Nations.

Sudan advanced after Uganda withdrew.

Second round

|}

Algeria won 3–2 on aggregate.

Morocco won 8–2 on aggregate.

Ivory Coast won 4–2 on aggregate.

Egypt won 4–3 on aggregate.

Guinea won 5–4 on aggregate.

Tanzania won 2–1 on aggregate.

Qualified teams

References

External links
 CAN 1980 details – rsssf.com

Qual
Qual
1980
1980 African Cup of Nations